Gabriel Toledo de Alcântara Sguario (born May 30, 1991), better known as FalleN, is a Brazilian professional Counter-Strike: Global Offensive player and former Counter-Strike: Source and Counter-Strike 1.6 player. He played the role of an AWPer for Imperial Esports. In 2015 he was chosen the most influential person in Brazilian eSports. He was also nominated PC personality of the year by the eSports Industry Awards in 2016. He is the owner of Brazilian eSports organization Games Academy. During 2016 and 2017, Fallen was described as one of the top AWPers, in-game leaders, and overall players in the world. He is also known as one of the few CS:GO players who use the AWP, and in-game lead, at the same time.

FalleN and four other Luminosity Gaming teammates were involved in a contract dispute between SK Gaming and Luminosity. Eventually the players transferred to SK.

Although winning their group stage in ELeague Season 1 being favorites to win, FalleN's SK Gaming team was ultimately removed from the tournament, along with SK Gaming's former team. The players and teams had violated one of the league's transfer rules, and several other team owners also signed a petition to remove the players.

He held an event for fans at MAX5 on August 13, 2016, in São Paulo.

Individual awards 
 Nominated the most influential person of Brazilian eSports (2015)
 Nominated PC personality of the year (2016) - E-Sports Industry Awards
 Nominated 2nd best player of the year (2016) - HLTV.org
 Nominated the "AWPer of the year" (2016) - GosuGamers.net 
 Nominated the "In-game leader of the year" (2016) - GosuGamers.net 
 30 under 30 in games (2017) - Forbes
 Most Valuable Player (MVP) of ESL One: Cologne 2017
 Nominated 6th best player of the year (2017)

See also 

 Gaules

References

Bibliography 
CS:GO player profiles - FalleN - Luminosity Gaming. Valve YouTube channel, Oct. 29 2015.

External links
 
 
 

Living people
People from São Paulo (state)
Brazilian people of Italian descent
Brazilian people of Portuguese descent
Brazilian people of Spanish descent
Brazilian esports players
Counter-Strike players
CompLexity Gaming players
Luminosity Gaming players
SK Gaming players
1991 births
Team Liquid players